Derek DelGaudio is an American interdisciplinary artist, primarily known as a writer, performer and magician.

He created the theater show In & Of Itself, directed by Frank Oz, and co-founded, along with artist Glenn Kaino, the performance-art collective A.BANDIT, which has staged interventions at Art L.A. Contemporary in Santa Monica, The Ball of Artists, Art Basel Miami, LA><ART, and The Kitchen in New York. DelGaudio and Kaino also created The Mistake Room, a platform for situation-specific projects, as well as The [Space] Between, a "conceptual magic shop". They have also co-authored a book under the A.BANDIT name, A Secret Has Two Faces, containing interviews and stories from their careers in performance art and magic, as well as contributions from Marina Abramović, Ricky Jay, David Blaine and John Baldessari.

In 2014, DelGaudio was selected Artist in Residence for Walt Disney Imagineering. He has also consulted for television and cinema projects including The Carbonaro Effect and The Prestige. He wrote and co-starred (with Hélder Guimarães) in the show Nothing to Hide, which was directed by Neil Patrick Harris and opened off-Broadway at the Romulus Linney Courtyard Theatre at the Pershing Square Signature Center in New York City on October 23, 2013.

Frank Oz directed a film version of In & Of Itself which was released on Hulu on January 22, 2021. DelGaudio's nonfiction book AMORALMAN: A True Story and Other Lies was released in March 2021.

In August 2021, Neal Brennan's one-man show, Unacceptable, debuted at New York City's Cherry Lane Theater, with DelGaudio as director.

In 2022, DelGaudio made his feature film acting debut in Steven Soderbergh's thriller Kimi.

Reception 
In the 2017 New York Times Magazine profile of DelGaudio, journalist Jonah Weiner wrote:

Awards and honors 
 The Academy of Magical Arts Close-up Magician of the Year 2011.
 The Academy of Magical Arts Close-up Magician of the Year 2012.
 The Academy of Magical Arts Magician of the Year 2016.
 The Allan Slaight Award for "Sharing Wonder," 2017.
 Fédération Internationale des Sociétés Magiques Award for Creative & Artistic Vision, 2018.
 Grolla d'oro Award, Italy, 2019 
 In 2011, the Conjuring Arts Research Center appointed DelGaudio their Director of Contemporary Conjuring.

References

External links 
 

1980s births
American magicians
Living people
People from Huntington Beach, California
Academy of Magical Arts Close-Up Magician of the Year winners
Academy of Magical Arts Magician of the Year winners